Saboto Scofield Caesar (born 21 December 1980), is a Vincentian politician and lawyer. He is an elected member of parliament, and minister of agriculture, for Saint Vincent and the Grenadines. Caesar is also the Unity Labour Party's parliamentary representative for South Central Windward. Successfully winning his seat in all three consecutive general elections, in 2010, 2015, and 2020 respectively.

Early life and education 
Saboto Scofield Caesar was born on the 21 December 1980, in the rural area of Diamond Village, within Charlotte parish, on the Windward side of Saint Vincent and the Grenadines.  He attended the Diamond Village Government School, in his native village, and the St. Martin's Secondary School, within the capital city of Kingstown. After completing his secondary education, he went on to the Saint Vincent and the Grenadines Community College (SVGCC). In his quest to obtain a career in the legal profession. Caesar travelled to London where he studied at the University of London, garnering him a Masters of Laws degree. He then enrolled at the University of the West Indies where he earned his Bachelors of laws degree. He also later obtained a legal education certificate from Hugh Wooding Law School.

Political career 
In 2008/2009, Caesar was nominated as a government senator within the Vincentian parliament for the Unity Labour Party administration. By prime minister Ralph Gonsalves, and he was appointed by then governor general Frederick Ballantyne. He was chosen to represent the parliamentary constituency of South Central Windward. As the outgoing minister Selmon Walters was retiring from politics. In the 2010 Vincentian general election. Caesar faced the poles for the first time and was elected to the cabinet for winning with 57.0% of the votes in his constituency.

In the 2015 Vincentian general election, Caesar was elected as a cabinet member after winning with 56.69℅ of the votes.

In the 2020 Vincentian general election, Caesar reclaimed his constituency of South Central Windward for the third consecutive time, thereby retaining his seat in the Vincentian parliament.

References

Living people
Saint Vincent and the Grenadines lawyers
Members of the House of Assembly of Saint Vincent and the Grenadines
1980 births